Goor is a railway station located in Goor, The Netherlands. The station was opened on 1 November 1865 and is located on the Zutphen–Glanerbeek railway between Zutphen and Hengelo. The train service is operated by Syntus. The trains of the service pass each other at this station.

Train services

Bus services

External links
NS website 
Dutch Public Transport journey planner 

Railway stations in Overijssel
Railway stations opened in 1865
Railway stations on the Staatslijn D
Hof van Twente